Voetbal Vereniging Ajax commonly known as Ajax, was a Surinamese football club based in Paramaribo that played in the Surinamese Hoofdklasse, the highest level of football in Suriname. The club played their home games on the Mr. Bronsplein. Named after the Dutch football club Ajax, the club was founded on 3 June 1921 by H. Gunning. The chairman of the club in its inception was H.M. Landkoer who successfully led the team to three national titles in the late twenties.

Honours
Hoofdklasse
Champions (3):1926–27, 1927–28, 1929

 Dragtenbeker
Winners (1):1929

 Emancipatiebeker
Winners (1):1929

References

External links
 De eerste Surinaamse sportencyclopedie (1893–1988) by Ricky W. Stutgard

Ajax
Ajax
1921 establishments in Suriname